The Taproot Foundation is a 501(c)(3) nonprofit organization that engages design, marketing, IT, strategic management, and human resources professionals  in pro bono service projects to build the infrastructure of other nonprofit organizations. Taproot Foundation's mission is to "drive social change by leading, mobilizing, and engaging professionals in pro bono service." Its work focuses around building a pro bono marketplace that, like philanthropy, is large, transparent, professional and accessible. The organization was founded in 2001 by Aaron Hurst. The current President and CEO is Lindsay Firestone Gruber.

About
Taproot Foundation is a national nonprofit that connects nonprofits and social change organizations with business professionals who offer pro bono services. Taproot is aims to help organizations dedicated to social change have full access—through pro bono service—to marketing, strategy, HR, and IT resources. Since 2001, Taproot’s network of volunteers has served over 7,600 social change organizations providing more than 1.7 million hours of work worth over $204 million in value. Taproot co-founded a network of global pro bono providers in over 30 countries around the world (as of May 2020).

Through Taproot's programs, thousands of business professionals have assisted nonprofits with capacity-building projects since 2001. Taproot also provides training to nonprofits on how to take advantage of pro bono services. Its Advisory Services Practice helps Fortune 500 companies in building high-impact pro bono programs. In 2014, Taproot launched www.taprootplus.org, an online matchmaking platform that directly matches skilled volunteers with nonprofits for shorter-term engagements.

Headquartered in San Francisco, California, the Taproot Foundation has additional offices in New York City, Chicago, and Los Angeles.

References

External links
 Taproot Foundation
 Taproot Plus
 Aaron Hurst Series on Huffington Post
 Aaron Hurst Series for Stanford Social Innovation Review
 A Billion + Change Campaign

Non-profit organizations based in San Francisco
501(c)(3) organizations